Lee Benjamin Minshull (born 11 November 1985) is an English former Professional footballer who played as a midfielder.

Career
Born in Chatham, Kent, Minshull played for Charlton Athletic School of Excellence as a youngster. He began his senior career with Ramsgate before moving to Tonbridge Angels in 2009. He played 40 times in the 2009–10 season; scoring 17 goals, making him the club's second top scorer for that season. In 2010, he left Tonbridge to join Conference Premier side AFC Wimbledon. He made his Football League debut for Wimbledon on 6 August 2011, in a 3–2 defeat to Bristol Rovers.

In January 2012, Minshull joined Newport County on loan. On 12 May 2012, he played for Newport in the FA Trophy Final at Wembley Stadium which Newport lost 2–0 to York City. In May 2012 Minshull was released by Wimbledon at the end of his contract and subsequently joined Newport County on a permanent contract. In the 2012–13 season he was part of the Newport team that finished 3rd in the league, reaching the Conference Premier play-offs. Newport County won the playoff final versus Wrexham at Wembley Stadium 2–0 to return to the Football League after a 25-year absence with promotion to Football League Two.

Minshull was released by Newport in May 2015 at the end of his contract. On 27 May 2015, he joined National League club Bromley. Following two seasons at the club, in which he became a fans' favourite, Minshull left Bromley to pursue a part-time career in football.

On 16 May 2018, following a spell at Leatherhead, Minshull joined Concord Rangers on a one-year deal.

In June 2020, Minshull announced his retirement from football, continuing on with Concord Rangers in the role of assistant manager.

Career statistics

Personal life
Minshull is in a relationship with Kelcie, the daughter of international referee Ian John-Lewis and loves a Stella Artoris. 
Minshull put his full-time career as a quantity surveyor on hold to play full-time football for AFC Wimbledon after their promotion to the Football League in 2011.

References

External links

1985 births
Living people
Sportspeople from Chatham, Kent
Footballers from Kent
English footballers
Association football midfielders
Sittingbourne F.C. players
Ramsgate F.C. players
Deal Town F.C. players
Tonbridge Angels F.C. players
AFC Wimbledon players
Newport County A.F.C. players
Bromley F.C. players
Leatherhead F.C. players
Concord Rangers F.C. players
English Football League players
National League (English football) players
Isthmian League players